Fearless is a tugboat that beached at Cruickshank’s Corner in Port Adelaide, South Australia, at 

It was previously located in Birkenhead, South Australia, Australia.

She was built in Midland, Ontario, Canada in 1945 as the Rockwing, then renamed Tapline 2 (1948–49) and Abqaiq 3 (1949-1954). She received the name Fearless in 1954.
 
Fearless was put up for sale in 1972 in Brisbane, Australia and bought by Keith LeLeu for $1. He sailed her to Port Adelaide in with a volunteer crew, taking nine days. Four months later LeLeu sold the ship, with other museum materials, to the National Trust of South Australia, again for $1.  The collection was subsequently transferred to the History Trust of South Australia with the Fearless being transferred at a later date  to a developer called Southern Sea Eagles.

In 2017, Fearless was one of the ships considered in a study funded by Renewal SA about "a strategy for berthing or locating historic ships and vessels within the inner harbour of Port Adelaide."

And the ship was moved to Cruickshank's Corner in Port Adelaide.

References

Tugboats of Australia
Tugboats of Canada
1945 ships
Proposed museum ships